PPIG may refer to:
PPIG (gene)
Psychology of Programming Interest Group